The Gloucestershire County Football League is a  football league in England, founded in 1968. The league is affiliated to the Gloucestershire County FA.

It sits at step 7 (or level 11) of the National League System and is a feeder to Divisions One of the Hellenic League and Western League. Clubs to move from the GCL to the Hellenic League in recent seasons are Brimscombe & Thrupp, Longlevens and Tuffley Rovers. The league has always consisted of a single division of clubs. In the 2022–23 season, 16 teams will compete in the league.

The Bristol & Suburban League, Bristol Premier Combination, and the Gloucestershire Northern Senior League feed the Gloucestershire County League.

Administration 
The League has a maximum size of 18 member clubs, who have to be affiliated to the Gloucestershire Football Association.

The club's ground or headquarters have to be located within the County of Gloucestershire or in those parts of the City of Bristol that were within the 1908 city boundaries.

The league is part of the National League system and clubs may apply for promotion to or from the League.

The Joint Liaison Committee, at the end of each season, confirms promotion and relegation of clubs between the leagues and is responsible for the boundary adjustments between the leagues where appropriate. The Committee is drawn from the Western Football League, Gloucestershire County League, Somerset County League, South West Peninsula League and the Wiltshire League.

History 
The league was originally formed in 1968. Its first chairman was F.Dowling, who was ably assisted by the Hon. Secretary, L.V. James. Les James has the Leagues' Cup Competition named after him in recognition of his service to football and the league within Gloucestershire. Chairman, Mr F. Dowling, presented the championship trophy to Stonehouse, who were the first winners of the County League.

Among the clubs that have left the Gloucestershire County League and now compete at a higher level are:

Almondsbury
Bishop's Cleeve
Brimscombe & Thrupp
Bitton
Bristol St George (now known as Roman Glass St. George)
Bristol Telephones
Cadbury Heath
Cinderford Town
Cirencester Town
Fairford Town
Cribbs Friends Life (now known as Cribbs)
Forest Green Rovers
Lawrence Weston Hallen (now known as Hallen)
Longlevens
Longwell Green Sports
Lydney Town
Newent Town
Oldland (now known as Oldland Abbotonians)
Slimbridge
Shortwood United
Thornbury Town
Tuffley Rovers
Tytherington Rocks
Winterbourne United
Yate Town

Former members of the County League that have dropped back into local football include:

Harrow Hill joined the County League in 1982/83 and gained promotion to the Hellenic Football League in 1995/96 but have now returned to the Gloucestershire Northern Senior League.

Member clubs for 2022–23 season 
Broadwell Amateurs
Bromley Heath United 
Cheltenham Civil Service 
Cribbs Reserves
Frampton United
Gala Wilton
Hardwicke
Henbury
Little Stoke
Patchway Town
Quedgeley Wanderers 
Rockleaze Rangers
Ruardean Hill Rangers
Sharpness AFC  
Stoke Gifford United
Wick

List of champions 

1968–69 – Stonehouse Town
1969–70 – Bristol St George
1970–71 – Cadbury Heath
1971–72 – Cadbury Heath
1972–73 – Cadbury Heath
1973–74 – Cadbury Heath
1974–75 – Matson Athletic
1975–76 – Matson Athletic
1976–77 – Almondsbury Greenway
1977–78 – Almondsbury Greenway
1978–79 – Almondsbury Greenway
1979–80 – Almondsbury Greenway
1980–81 – Almondsbury Greenway
1981–82 – Shortwood United
1982–83 – Old Georgians
1983–84 – Sharpness
1984–85 – Old Georgians
1985–86 – Patchway
1986–87 – Old Georgians
1987–88 – Old Georgians
1988–89 – Lawrence Weston Hallen
1989–90 – Ellwood
1990–91 – Tuffley Rovers
1991–92 – Patchway Town
1992–93 – Hallen
1993–94 – Cadbury Heath
1994–95 – Henbury Old Boys
1995–96 – DRG
1996–97 – Old Georgians
1997–98 – Cadbury Heath
1998–99 – Cadbury Heath
1999–00 – Highridge United
2000–01 – Winterbourne United
2001–02 – Roman Glass St. George
2002–03 – Patchway Town
2003–04 – Almondsbury
2004–05 – Highridge United
2005–06 – Lydney Town
2006–07 – Roman Glass St. George
2007–08 – Hardwicke
2008–09 – Slimbridge
2009–10 – Thornbury Town
2010–11 – Brimscombe & Thrupp
2011–12 – Cribbs Friends Life
2012–13 – Longlevens
2013–14 – Longlevens
2014–15 – Cheltenham Civil Service
2015–16 – AEK Boco
2016–17 – Bristol Telephones
2017–18 – Thornbury Town
2018–19 – Lebeq United
2019–20 – Not completed due to the Covid-19 Pandemic
2020–21 – Not completed due to the Covid-19 Pandemic
2021–22 – Wick

References

External links 
Gloucestershire County League
FA Full-time

 
1968 establishments in England
Football in Gloucestershire
Football leagues in England
Sports leagues established in 1968